Maués Açu River is a river of the northwest Brazilian state of Amazonas. The upper course of the river is known as Parauari River. It is located east of the Madeira River and south of the Amazon River. It is connected to both these, as well as several other smaller rivers, via the Paraná Urariá channel. The town of Maués is located on the eastern bank of the river near the point where it merges into Paraná Urariá.

See also
List of rivers of Amazonas

References
Brazilian Ministry of Transport

Rivers of Amazonas (Brazilian state)